Margaret Louise Hines (October 15, 1909 – December 23, 1985), also known as Marjorie Hines or Margie Hines, was an American animation voice artist. 

She was known for her work at Fleischer Studios, where she was the original voice of Betty Boop, (although Little Ann Little erroneously claimed to have been the first and longest serving voice artist), Hines served from 1930 until 1932 and again from 1938 until 1939, before voicing Olive Oyl and Swee' Pea in the Popeye the Sailor cartoons from 1938 to 1944. She also provided the voices for Fleischer's animated films Gulliver's Travels and Mr Bug Goes to Town.

Career 
Hines was the original voice actress for Fleischer's cartoon character Betty Boop, whilst she was touring vaudeville she was heard by vocalist Billy Murray, an employee at Fleischer studio who suggested she was the right choice for the voice of the character she made her who debut in the cartoon short Dizzy Dishes in 1930, studio head Max Fleischer hired Hines, as she was a Helen Kane sound-alike, and Kane was the basis for the character, who in turn based her act on singer and child entertainer Baby Esther. Hines and several other actress voiced Betty until Mae Questel took over the role in 1931.

Beginning in 1932, Hines also did vocals for Aesop's Film Fables and Tom and Jerry produced by Van Beuren Studios. Her Van Beuren credits were erroneously attributed to Bonnie Poe, another actress who'd worked for Fleischer on Betty Boop cartoons.

Mae Questel, who was Fleischer's voice for Betty Boop and Popeye characters Olive Oyl and Swee'Pea during the mid-1930s, was unable to move with the Fleischer Studios staff when they left New York City for Miami. As a result, Hines was hired to replace Questel in both the Betty Boop and Popeye series, beginning in 1938. Hines voiced Betty Boop through her final series entries in 1939, and continued to voice Olive until 1943, when the studio, by then taken over by Paramount Pictures and renamed Famous Studios, returned to New York. The Marry-Go-Round (1943) was Hines' final short as the voice of Olive, with Mae Questel returning to the role in 1944.

Personal life 
Hines was born in Glendale, Queens, New York City, in October 1909 as Margaret Louise Hines.

On March 3, 1939, at the purported age of 21, Hines married her 29 year old co-star Winfield B. "Jack" Mercer, who provided the voice of Popeye. At the time of her marriage, her mother lived on Long Island and had the two remarry at a New York church. The two later divorced in 1950. Hines married for a second time in 1951, to Raymond Brenneis (1922–1981), in Greenwich, Connecticut. However, the couple divorced in 1954. In 1956, Hines married Jesse William Heidtmann (1918–1997) in Southold, New York.

Under the name Marjorie L. Heidtmann, Hines died in Seaford, New York on December 23, 1985, at the age of 76. She was survived by her husband Jesse, who died in June 1997, at the age of 79.

Filmography

Notes

References

External links 
 

1909 births
1985 deaths
20th-century American actresses
Actresses from New York City
American voice actresses
Famous Studios people
Fleischer Studios people